River Abasha Waterfall Natural Monument is a waterfall  at the source of Abasha River with a height of 30 m at 630 m above sea level in Martvili Municipality, Samegrelo-Zemo Svaneti region of Georgia.

Waterfall is on the top of huge limestone rock described as Late Cretaceous deposits, in the south-western section of Askhi Limestone Massif. It creates a hole with a diameter of 12 m at the point of fall. It is one of the distinguished waterfalls in Georgia for its aesthetic qualities as well as ecological potential. 

The main waterfall stream is accompanied by two streams to it right side and one small waterfall stream to the left side. Abasha waterfall joins Abasha river from the left bank of the river. The areas in the vicinity of the waterfall and Abasha river banks are covered with dense forests. The climate in vicinity of Abasha Waterfall is humid subtropical. Waterfall itself creates microclimate which supports characteristic flora and fauna.

See also 
Abasha (river)
Balda Canyon Natural Monument
Gachedili Canyon Natural Monument

References

Natural monuments of Georgia (country)
Waterfalls of Georgia (country)